Straumsvík ("stream cove") is a harbour on the northern shore of the Reykjanes Peninsula in Iceland.

References 

Southern Peninsula (Iceland)
Ports and harbours in Europe